Cantharis obscura is a species of beetle belonging to the family Cantharidae

Description

Elytra and head are black. Pronotum is black, with reddish or orange lateral margins. The adults feed on small insects, such as aphids, as well as on pollen of fruit trees.

Distribution
This species can be found in most of Europe and in the eastern Palearctic realm.

Habitat
These beetles live in bushes, edges of forests, and meadows.

References
 Biolib
 Fauna europaea
 Commanster

Cantharidae
Beetles of Europe
Articles containing video clips
Beetles described in 1758
Taxa named by Carl Linnaeus